Ilford Road is a Tyne and Wear Metro station, primarily serving the suburb of Gosforth, Newcastle upon Tyne, England. It joined the network on 11 August 1980, following the opening of the first phase of the network, between Haymarket and Tynemouth via Four Lane Ends.

History
Unlike nearby South Gosforth and West Jesmond station, which were converted from British Rail stations, Ilford Road was purpose-built for the network. It was the "typical Metro halt" used in publicity when the system first opened. When other stations were being repainted red, green or blue in the early 2000s, Ilford Road was repainted in original brown, with much of the unpainted concrete being painted cream.

Facilities 
Step-free access is available at all stations across the Tyne and Wear Metro network, with ramped access to platforms at Ilford Road. The station is equipped with ticket machines, waiting shelter, seating, next train information displays, timetable posters, and an emergency help point on both platforms. Ticket machines are able to accept payment with credit and debit card (including contactless payment), notes and coins. The station is also fitted with smartcard validators, which feature at all stations across the network.

There is no dedicated car parking available at this station. There is the provision for cycle parking, with two cycle pods available for use.

Services 
, the station is served by up to ten trains per hour on weekdays and Saturday, and up to eight trains per hour during the evening and on Sunday.

Rolling stock used: Class 599 Metrocar

References

External links
 
 Timetable and station information for Ilford Road

Newcastle upon Tyne
1980 establishments in England
Railway stations in Great Britain opened in 1980
Tyne and Wear Metro Green line stations
Tyne and Wear Metro Yellow line stations
Transport in Tyne and Wear
